The Military Counterintelligence Service (SKW) is one of the principal intelligence agencies of Poland. It is responsible for the protection of Poland against internal threats and for the combat capability of the Polish Armed Forces.

SKW was established under the Act of June 9, 2006, and is subordinate to the Ministry of National Defence. It was founded on October 1, 2006, the day before the Military Information Services was dissolved. Antoni Macierewicz was the first head of the SKW. On June 22, 2012, the SKW was given the standard.

References

External links
 skw.gov.pl — Official website

Poland
Polish intelligence agencies
2006 establishments in Poland
Government agencies established in 2006
Military units and formations established in 2006
Counterintelligence agencies